I Am or I'm may refer to:

Language and literature
 "I Am that I Am", a common English translation of the response God used in the Hebrew Bible when Moses asked for His name
 I am (biblical term), a Christian term used in the Bible
 "I Am" (poem), an 1848 poem by John Clare
 I Am: Eucharistic Meditations on the Gospel, a 1912 book by Cabrera de Armida

Film and television
 I Am, a 2005 Polish film directed by Dorota Kędzierzawska
 , a 2009 Russian film with Oksana Akinshina 
 I Am (2010 American documentary film), a film by Tom Shadyac
 I Am (2010 American drama film), a Christian-themed film by John Ward
 I Am (2010 Indian film), an anthology film by Onir
 I Am, a 2011 Indian documentary film by Sonali Gulati
 I Am (2012 film), a documentary film about 32 SM Town K-pop artists
 I Am... a 2019-2021 Channel 4 anthology television series
 "I Am." (Lovecraft Country), a 2020 television episode

Music

Performers
 I Am (American band), an alternative rock band
 I Am (French band) or IAM, a hip hop band

Albums
 I Am... (Ayumi Hamasaki album) or the title song, 2002
 I Am (Becoming the Archetype album) or the title song, 2012
 I Am (Chrisette Michele album), 2007
 I Am (Earth, Wind & Fire album), 1979
 I Am (Elisa Fiorillo album) or the title song, 1990
 I Am (Leona Lewis album) or the title song (see below), 2015
 I Am (Mao Denda album), 2009
 I Am (Michael Tolcher album) or the title song, 2004
 I Am (Monrose album), 2008
 I Am… (Nas album), 1999
 I Am (Pete Townshend album), 1972
 I Am (Scout Niblett album) or the title song, 2003
 I Am (Yo Gotti album) or the title song, 2013
 I Am... Sasha Fierce, by Beyoncé, 2008
 I Am..., by Futuristic, 2019
 I Am, by Texas in July, 2009

EPs
 I Am (EP), by (G)I-dle, 2018
 I'm (EP), by Sejeong, 2021
 I Am, by the Reverb Junkie (Michelle Chamuel), 2015
 I Am (Future Black President) The EP, by Novel, 2008

Songs
 "I Am" (Awolnation song), 2015
 "I Am" (Crowder song), 2013
 "I Am" (Kid Rock song), 2004
 "I Am" (Killing Heidi song), 2004
 "I Am" (Leona Lewis song), 2015
 "I Am" (Mark Schultz song), 2006
 "I Am" (Mary J. Blige song), 2009
 "I Am" (Train song), 2000
 "I Am" (Uncanny X-Men song), 1986
 "I Am", by Army of Lovers from The Gods of Earth and Heaven, 1993
 "I Am", by Axwell and Sick Individuals featuring Taylr Renee, 2013
 "I Am", by Bobby Darin from Inside Out, 1967
 "I Am", by Bon Jovi from Have a Nice Day, 2005
 "I Am", by Christina Aguilera from Bionic, 2010
 "I Am", by Dio from Master of the Moon, 2004
 "I Am", by Dope from  Group Therapy, 2003
 "I Am", by Drowning Pool from Sinner, 2001
 "I Am", by Godsmack from Faceless, 2003
 "I Am", by Hilary Duff from Hilary Duff, 2004
 "I Am", by Hitomi from Huma-rhythm, 2002
 "I Am", by Hollywood Undead from Notes from the Underground, 2013
 "I Am", by James Arthur from Back from the Edge, 2016
 "I Am", by JoJo from Mad Love, 2016
 "I Am", by Jorja Smith from the Black Panther film soundtrack, 2018
 "I Am", by Lil Baby and Gunna from Drip Harder, 2018
 "I Am", by Mýa from Liberation, 2007
 "I Am", by Static-X from Wisconsin Death Trip, 1999
 "I Am", by Suggs from The Three Pyramids Club, 1998
 "I Am", by Yung Baby Tate from After the Rain, 2020
 "I Am (Interlude)", by Kendrick Lamar from Kendrick Lamar, 2009

Concert tours
I Am Tour (Leona Lewis), a 2016 tour
I Am... (Beyoncé tour), a 2009 tour by Beyoncé

Other uses
 "I AM" Activity, the original Ascended Master Teachings religious movement
 "i’m" initiative, of Windows Live Messenger
 "I Am", a 2008 slogan and marketing campaign by Orange United Kingdom

See also
 I Am What I Am (disambiguation)
 IAM (disambiguation)
 IM (disambiguation)
 
 
 
 
 "What I Am", a song by Edie Brickell